Andre Begemann and Aliaksandr Bury were the defending champions but only Bury chose to defend his title, partnering Andreas Siljeström. Bury lost in the final to Wesley Koolhof and Artem Sitak.

Koolhof and Sitak won the title after defeating Bury and Siljeström 6–1, 7–5 in the final.

Seeds

Draw

References
 Main Draw
 Qualifying Draw

Pekao Szczecin Open - Doubles
2017 Doubles